Maja Møller Alm (born July 10, 1988) is a Danish orienteering and Athletics competitor who has won seven World Championships and two World Games titles. She is especially known for her four gold medals on the sprint distance, where she has won the title four years in a row: 2015, 2016, 2017 and 2018. She is also a medalist from the Junior World Championships. Since 2006 she has been coached by Danish national coach Lars Lindstrøm. Alm is remarkable for her dominant running speed, which gives her a great advantage over other competitors at the sprint distance.

Junior career
Alm won a silver medal in relay at the Junior World Orienteering Championships in Gothenburg in 2008, together with Ida Bobach and Signe Klinting, and received an individual bronze medal in sprint at the 2007 championships in Dubbo.

Senior career
In her early career, she competed for the Danish relay team at the 2007 World Orienteering Championships in Kyiv, where the team finished 8th. At the 2008 European Orienteering Championships in Ventspils, the Danish relay team finished 10th.
She won a bronze medal at the European Orienteering Championships in Bulgaria in 2010.

In 2015, she won the first of four sprint gold medals in a row at the World Championships. Alm also won the Relay and Mixed Sprint Relay in the same year.

In 2017, Alm took her first individual forest medal at the World Championships – a silver in the Classic – behind Swedish runner Tove Alexandersson.

In 2018, Alm won her fourth sprint gold medal at the World Orienteering Championship in Riga, and in addition she brought the Danish mixed sprint relay team at the last leg from the seventh position to a bronze medal. She also won a silver medal in the long distance.

Alm runs for OK Pan Århus, and won the Jukola relay for the club in 2013 and 2014.

World Championship results

Athletics
Alm competed in the 2018 European Cross Country Championships in Tilburg, where she finished 18th.

In 2019, she competed in the senior women's race at the 2019 IAAF World Cross Country Championships held in Aarhus, Denmark. She finished in 53rd place.

See also
 Danish orienteers
 List of orienteers
 List of orienteering events

References

External links

1988 births
Living people
Danish orienteers
Female orienteers
Foot orienteers
World Orienteering Championships medalists
World Games silver medalists
Competitors at the 2009 World Games
Competitors at the 2013 World Games
Competitors at the 2017 World Games
World Games gold medalists
World Games medalists in orienteering
20th-century Danish women
21st-century Danish women
Junior World Orienteering Championships medalists